Lycée Léonard de Vinci is a senior high school/sixth form college in Levallois-Perret, Hauts-de-Seine, France, in the Paris metropolitan area.

 it has 1,744 students.

History
It was formed in 1990 by a merger with a technical high school and a professional high school. Its current building, then newly constructed, opened on November 22, 1993.

In April 2016 the campus experienced arson that destroyed the school's lobby. Damages were estimated to be €150,000. A student was convicted of causing the riot that resulted in the arson.

References

External links

 Lycée Léonard de Vinci 

Lycées in Hauts-de-Seine